The Main Post and Telegraph Office, formerly Weltevreden Postkantoor and Filateli Jakarta is now Pos Bloc, it is a historic building in Weltevreden, Jakarta, Indonesia. It was designed by J van Hoytema and built in 1913. It is located next to St. Ursula Catholic School and near the Jakarta Cathedral and Istiqlal Mosque (Independence Mosque).

References

Post office buildings in Indonesia
Buildings and structures in Jakarta